David Braine may refer to:
David Braine (philosopher) (1940–2017), British analytic philosopher
David Braine (athletic director) (born 1943), former athletic director for Georgia Tech, Virginia Tech, and Marshall

See also
David Brain (born 1964), Zimbabwean cricketer
Dave Brain (1879–1959), English baseball player